WNRS can refer to:

 WNRS, a global accounts receivable management & customer care company headquartered in Miami, Florida
 WNRS (AM), an AM radio station located in Herkimer, New York
 WNRS-FM, an FM radio station located in Sweet Briar, Virginia
 The former call sign of the AM station now known as WLBY in Saline, Michigan